Balsillie may refer to:

People with the surname

 James Laurence "Jim" Balsillie (Canadian businessman and philanthropist) 
 John Graeme "Graeme" Balsillie (pioneer of wireless telegraphy in Australia)
 Mary Anne Balsillie (Canadian politician)

People with the given name
 William Balsillie Small (Scottish trade unionist)

Businesses including the name
Balsillie School of International Affairs (Centre for research into global governance and international public policy)